The 1961 Coppa Italia Final was the final of the 1960–61 Coppa Italia. The match was played on 11 June 1961 between Fiorentina and Lazio. Fiorentina won 2–0.

Match

References 
Coppa Italia 1960/61 statistics at rsssf.com
 https://www.calcio.com/calendario/ita-coppa-italia-1960-1961-finale/2/
 https://www.worldfootball.net/schedule/ita-coppa-italia-1960-1961-finale/2/

Coppa Italia Finals
Coppa Italia Final 1961
Coppa Italia Final 1961